The following elections occurred in the year 1987.

Africa
 1987 Central African Republic parliamentary election
 1987 Comorian legislative election
 1987 Djiboutian general election
 1987 Ethiopian general election
 1987 Gambian general election
 1987 Malawian general election
 1987 Mauritian general election
 1987 Seychellois parliamentary election
 1987 South African general election
 1987 Swazi general election
 1987 Zairean parliamentary election

Asia
 1987 Indonesian legislative election
 1987 Philippine House of Representatives elections
 1987 Philippine Senate election
 1987 Philippine legislative election
 1987 South Korean presidential election
 1987 Indian presidential election
 1987 Turkish general election

Europe
 1987 Åland legislative election
 1987 Albanian parliamentary election
 1987 Belgian general election
 1987 Danish parliamentary election
 1987 Finnish parliamentary election
 1987 Icelandic parliamentary election
 1987 Irish general election
 1987 Italian general election
 1987 Italian nuclear power referendum
 1987 Maltese general election
 1987 Norwegian local elections
 1987 Portuguese legislative election

European Parliament
 European Parliament election, 1987 (Portugal)
 European Parliament election, 1987 (Spain)

Germany
 1987 Rhineland-Palatinate state election
 1987 West German federal election

Spain
 Elections to the Aragonese Corts, 1987
 Elections to the Corts Valencianes, 1987
 European Parliament election, 1987 (Spain)

United Kingdom
 1987 United Kingdom general election
 1987 Greenwich by-election
 List of MPs elected in the 1987 United Kingdom general election
 1987 Truro by-election
 1987 University of Oxford Chancellor election

United Kingdom local
 1987 United Kingdom local elections

English local
 1987 Bristol City Council elections
 1987 Manchester Council election
 1987 Trafford Council election
 1987 Wolverhampton Council election

North America

Canada
 1987 New Brunswick general election
 1987 Northwest Territories general election
 1987 Ontario general election
 1987 Quebec municipal elections

Caribbean
 1987 Haitian presidential election
 1987 Montserratian general election

United States
 1987 United States gubernatorial elections
 1987 Houston mayoral election

Oceania
 1987 Fijian general election
 1987 New Zealand general election
 1987 Papua New Guinean general election
 1987 Tongan general election
 1987 Vanuatuan general election

Australia
 1987 Australian federal election
 1987 Northern Territory general election
 1987 Southport state by-election

South America
 1987 Argentine legislative election

See also

 
1987
Elections